The World's 50 Best Bars is an annual list that celebrates the best of the international drinks scene, providing a yearly ranking of bars, voted for by more than 650 drinks experts from across the globe

History 
The list was first announced in 2009, with annual award ceremonies held in London since the inaugural event in 2012. In 2022, the ceremony moved for the first time from London to Barcelona. Incorporating grand hotel bars, secretive speakeasies, quirky salons and dive bars, The World's 50 Best Bars list aims to celebrate the diversity and universality of the drinks culture and to reflect new bar scenes developing all over the world. 
The World's 50 Best Bars is owned and organised by William Reed Ltd, the group behind The World's 50 Best Restaurants. William Reed is solely responsible for organising the awards, collating the votes, and producing the lists. None of the employees of the organiser or any of the sponsors associated with the awards, including the main sponsor, has any influence over the results.

In 2016, The World's 50 Best Bars brand was extended with the launch of Asia's 50 Best Bars, the first regional Bars award for the brand. A second regional list, North America's 50 Best Bars, was launched in 2022.

The Voting Process 
The list is compiled by votes from The World's 50 Best Bars Academy, which comprises more than 650 drinks experts with 50/50 gender parity, including renowned bartenders and consultants, drinks writers, and cocktail specialists from around the world. The Academy of voters is spread across 28 global geographic regions, each headed by an Academy Chair who selects their region's voters, with the distribution of voters designed to reflect the relative development and sophistication of the drinks sector, and the concentration of quality bars, in each region. Voters are required to remain anonymous and voting is confidential, secure and independently adjudicated by Deloitte.

The World's Best Bars

Asia's 50 Best Bars

North America's 50 Best Bars

See also 

List of food and drink awards
The World's 50 Best Restaurants

References

External links 

Bars (establishments)
Food and drink awards